Nolberto Molina Flórez (born 5 January 1953) is a former Colombian football defender and manager.

Career
Born in Palmira, Valle del Cauca, Molina played club football for Independiente Medellín, Once Caldas, Millonarios and Atlético Nacional, appearing in 596 matches, and scoring 46 goals. Molina began his career with Medellín and joined Millonarios in 1983, where he was involved in organizing a Colombian football player's union (Afucol).

Molina made several appearances for the Colombia national football team, including at Copa América 1983 and Copa América 1987. In total, he made 18 appearances and scored one goal.

After he retired from playing, Molina became a football coach. He managed Independiente Medellín during 1995.

References

External links

1953 births
Living people
People from Palmira, Valle del Cauca
Colombian footballers
Colombia international footballers
Categoría Primera A players
Independiente Medellín footballers
Once Caldas footballers
Millonarios F.C. players
Atlético Nacional footballers
Colombian football managers
Independiente Medellín managers
Association football defenders
Sportspeople from Valle del Cauca Department